Thomas Vincent Kerwin (born July 7, 1944) is a retired American professional basketball player. Kerwin played college basketball at Centenary College of Louisiana.  A 6'7" forward, Kerwin was taken in the 1966 NBA draft by the San Francisco Warriors with the 3rd pick in the 5th round (43rd overall). He played with the Pittsburgh Pipers for one season, his first game was on October 24, 1967. He played in 13 games, for 68 minutes in total, scoring 14 points on a .318 field goal percentage, while also recovering 20 rebounds. He did, however, stay on the team long enough to win an ABA championship with the team before retiring.

Kerwin's brother Jim played basketball at Tulane University and for the Phillips 66ers, and was later a coach.

References

External links
Basketball-Reference.com Tom Kerwin page

1944 births
Living people
American men's basketball players
Basketball players from Louisiana
Basketball players from New Jersey
Centenary Gentlemen basketball players
Forwards (basketball)
Long Branch High School alumni
People from Long Branch, New Jersey
Phillips 66ers players
Pittsburgh Pipers players
Place of birth missing (living people)
San Francisco Warriors draft picks
Sportspeople from Monmouth County, New Jersey